Dennis Miller is a New Zealand Paralympian who competed in athletics and table tennis. At the 1976 Summer Paralympics, he won gold medals in the 60m 1C and Slalom 1C. At the 1980 Summer Paralympics, he won a gold medal in the Slalom 1C, and a bronze medal in the 60m 1C. At the 1984 Summer Paralympics, he won a gold medal in the Slalom 1C. He also competed at the 1972 Summer Paralympics.

References

External links 
 
 

Living people
Year of birth missing (living people)
Paralympic athletes of New Zealand
Athletes (track and field) at the 1972 Summer Paralympics
Athletes (track and field) at the 1976 Summer Paralympics
Athletes (track and field) at the 1980 Summer Paralympics
Athletes (track and field) at the 1984 Summer Paralympics
Paralympic gold medalists for New Zealand
Paralympic bronze medalists for New Zealand
Medalists at the 1976 Summer Paralympics
Medalists at the 1980 Summer Paralympics
Medalists at the 1984 Summer Paralympics
Paralympic medalists in athletics (track and field)
New Zealand wheelchair racers